Christopher Creek is located at the base of the Mogollon Rim in the state of Arizona. The nearby town of Christopher Creek is named after this body of water.

Fish species
 Rainbow trout
 Brown trout
 Brook trout

External links
 Arizona Fishing Locations Map
 Arizona Boating Locations Facilities Map

References

 

Rivers of the Mogollon Rim
Rivers of Arizona
Rivers of Gila County, Arizona